Euproserpinus phaeton, the Phaeton primrose sphinx moth, is a moth of the family Sphingidae. the species was first described by Augustus Radcliffe Grote and Herbert C. Robinson in 1865. It is found in North America from California south to Baja California Sur and further into Mexico. It has also been reported in south-western Arizona.

The length of the forewings is 32–42 mm. The abdomen upperside has creamy white side-tufts and a discontinuous dorsal white band. The forewing upperside has a median area which is mainly lacking transverse lines. The hindwing upperside has a straight marginal black band with some black scales. The hindwing underside is lacking black basally.

Adults fly swiftly and close to the ground over dry washes and flat areas in deserts. There is one generation with adults on wing from February to April. Adults nectar at flowers during the day.

The larvae feed on various Onagraceae species.

References

Euproserpinus
Moths of North America
Lepidoptera of Mexico
Fauna of the Colorado Desert
Fauna of the Sonoran Desert
Fauna of the Baja California Peninsula
Natural history of Baja California
Natural history of Baja California Sur
Natural history of the California chaparral and woodlands
Moths described in 1865